is a Japanese rower. She competed in the women's lightweight double sculls event at the 2012 Summer Olympics.

References

1988 births
Living people
Japanese female rowers
Olympic rowers of Japan
Rowers at the 2012 Summer Olympics
Sportspeople from Saga Prefecture
Asian Games medalists in rowing
Rowers at the 2010 Asian Games
Asian Games silver medalists for Japan
Medalists at the 2010 Asian Games
21st-century Japanese women